Ezerets may refer to the following places in Bulgaria:

 Ezerets, Blagoevgrad Province
 Ezerets, Dobrich Province